Beqa (pronounced ) is an island in Fiji, an outlier to the main island of Viti Levu,  to the south. Beqa has 9 villages broken into 2 Tikinas or Districts: Sawau and Raviravi.

The villages of Dakuibeqa (the chiefly village of the Sawau people), Dakuni, Soliyaga, Naceva and Naseuseu are part of the Tikina (District) of Sawau.  The villages of Nawaisomo, Raviravi, Lalati and Rukua are part of the Tikina (District) of Raviravi.

Tradition
Of the 9 villages on the island, Dakuibeqa Dakuni, Soliyaga, Naceva and Rukua are noted for the tradition of fire-walking. The phenomenon was examined in 1902 when it was already a tourist attraction, with a "Probable Explanation of the Mystery" arrived at.

Energy
The Fiji Times reported on 25 February 2006 that over 3000 inhabitants of six villages and five resorts were exploring ways to find a reliable source of power for Beqa.  Wind and solar power were being considered, as was a cable across Beqa Strait from the mainland.

Economy
Beqa's main source of income is tourism; it has 4 resorts: Lawaki Beach House, Beqa Lagoon Resort (formerly Marlin Bay Resort), Kulu Bay Resort, Lalati Resort. Additionally, Royal Davui Resort is located on an Islet off Beqa, Steward Island. No other resorts are planned for Beqa.
There is some small scale farming ventures and with improved infrastructure this could be expanded and become a larger revenue earner for the various villages of Beqa.

Beqa has developed a name for off season tomatoes, due to the unique climate Beqa has which allows tomatoes to be planted year round.

Notable people
Sainimili Naivalu, wheelchair table tennis medalist and disability rights activist.
Elina Nasaudrodro, Fijian international judōka, originally from Dakuni village

See also

 List of islands

References

Islands of Fiji
Viti Levu